For mathematical analysis and statistics, Leave-one-out error can refer to the following:

 Leave-one-out cross-validation Stability (CVloo, for stability of Cross Validation with leave one out): An algorithm f has CVloo stability β with respect to the loss function V if the following holds:

 Expected-to-leave-one-out error Stability (for Expected error from leaving one out): An algorithm f has  stability if for each n there exists a and a  such that:

, with and  going to zero for

Preliminary notations
With X and Y being a subset of the real numbers R, or X and Y ⊂ R, being respectively an input space X and an output space Y, we consider a training set:

of size m in  drawn independently and identically distributed (i.i.d.) from an unknown distribution, here called "D". Then a learning algorithm is a function  from  into  which maps a learning set S onto a function  from the input space X to the output space Y. To avoid complex notation, we consider only deterministic algorithms. It is also assumed that the algorithm  is symmetric with respect to S, i.e. it does not depend on the order of the elements in the training set. Furthermore, we assume that all functions are measurable and all sets are countable which does not limit the interest of the results presented here.

The true error of f is 

Given a training set S of size m, we will build, for all i = 1....,m, modified training sets as follows:
 By removing the i-th element

 and/or by replacing the i-th element

See also 
 Constructive analysis
 History of calculus
 Hypercomplex analysis
 Jackknife resampling
 Statistical classification
 Timeline of calculus and mathematical analysis

References
S. Mukherjee, P. Niyogi, T. Poggio, and R. M. Rifkin. Learning theory: stability is sufficient for generalization and necessary and sufficient for consistency of empirical risk minimization. Adv. Comput. Math., 25(1-3):161–193, 2006

Machine learning